Adelopsyche is an extinct genus of moths in the family Psychidae. The single species, Adelopsyche frustans, was found in the Florissant Fossil Beds National Monument in Colorado, United States. The fossil is dated to the Late Eocene.

References

Sohn, J.-C. et al. 2012: An annotated catalog of fossil and subfossil Lepidoptera (Insecta: Holometabola) of the world. Zootaxa, 3286: 1–132.

External links

Natural History Museum Lepidoptera generic names catalog

†
Fossil Lepidoptera
Eocene insects of North America
†
†
Priabonian insects
Paleogene Colorado
Prehistoric insects of North America
†